The 2020 World's Best Racehorse Rankings, sponsored by Longines was the 2020 edition of the World's Best Racehorse Rankings. It was an assessment of Thoroughbred racehorses issued by the International Federation of Horseracing Authorities (IFHA) on 26 January 2021. It included horses aged three or older which competed in flat races during 2020. It was open to all horses irrespective of where they raced or where they were trained.

Rankings for 2020
For a detailed guide to this table, see below.

Guide
A complete guide to the main table above.

References

World Thoroughbred Racehorse Rankings
2020 in horse racing